The Roccellaceae are a family of fungi in the order Arthoniomycetes. Most taxa are lichenized with green algae, although some are lichenicolous, growing on other lichens.

Genera
, Species Fungorum (in the Catalogue of Life) accepts 47 genera and 266 species in family Roccellaceae.
Ancistrosporella  – 3 spp.
Austrographa  – 3 spp.
Austroroccella  – 1 sp.
Baidera  – 1 sp.
Chiodecton  – ca. 22 spp.
Cresponea  – 21 spp.
Crocellina  – 1 sp.
Dendrographa  – 7 spp.
Dichosporidium  – 8 spp.
Diplogramma  – 1 spp.
Dirina  – 13 spp.
Dirinastrum  – 2 spp.
Diromma   – 1 sp.
Enterodictyon  – 2 spp. *
Enterographa  – (ca. 30 and 25 orphaned)
Erythrodecton  – 3 spp.
Feigeana  – 1 sp.
Follmanniella   – 1 sp.
Gorgadesia   – 1 sp.
Graphidastra   – 4 spp.
Gyrographa   – 3 spp.
Gyronactis   – 2 spp.
Halographis  – 1 sp.
Haplodina  – 3 spp.
Isalonactis  – 1 sp.
Lecanactis  – ca. 30 spp.
Mazosia  – 27 spp.
Ocellomma  – 1 sp.
Paralecanographa  – 1 sp.
Protoroccella  – 2 spp.
Pseudolecanactis  – 1 sp.
Pseudoschismatomma  – 1 sp.
Psoronactis  – 1 sp.
Pulvinodecton  – 2 spp.
Roccella  – 32 spp.
Roccellina  – (29 + 5 orphaned in Sigridea)
Roccellodea  – 1 sp.
Sagenidiopsis  – 4 spp.
Schismatomma  – 10 spp.
Sigridea  – 6 spp.
Simonyella  – 1 sp.
Sipmania  – 1 sp.
Streimannia  – 1 sp.
Syncesia  – ca. 25 spp.
Tania  – 2 spp.
Vigneronia  – 3 spp.

References

Lichen families
Ascomycota families
Taxa named by François Fulgis Chevallier